Seal Island in the Great Southern region of Western Australia (located at ) is approximately  south-east of Albany and approximately  offshore from Frenchman Bay in King George Sound. The island is designated as a nature reserve (Reserve Number 32199).

The island is composed entirely of granite and is only accessible at the western end.

History
George Vancouver named Seal Island in 1791 along with Breaksea Island, Michaelmas Island and other features around King George Sound.

Matthew Flinders landed on Seal Island during the voyage of the Investigator in 1801, searching for items that were reportedly left by Vancouver and leaving behind a bottle containing a parchment with details of their own arrival and departure.

HMAS Perth was scuttled behind Seal Island in 2001, and is now one of Western Australia's premier dive sites.

References

Islands of the Great Southern (Western Australia)
Albany, Western Australia
King George Sound